Important Things with Demetri Martin was a sketch-variety show that aired on Comedy Central starring comedian Demetri Martin. Each episode examined a single theme, the "important thing", such as timing, power, control and money. All sketches, short vignettes, animated segments and stand-up comedy were loosely related to the theme of the episode. The show was produced by Jon Stewart's Busboy Productions,
and contained stand-up, prop comedy and musical comedy by Martin, as well as taped sketches. Jon Stewart took an active role in editing the first few episodes. H. Jon Benjamin appeared in eight episodes and had a writing credit on seven as well.

Recurring segments
In addition to Demetri's unconventional style of stand-up comedy, which he has performed for many years, there are several recurring segments on the show including:

Opening Act – In the opening of the show, Demetri Martin greets the audience and brings up the theme/topic of the show. This is followed with a short joke via flashcards. The card generally has play-buttons with a caption under them, which Demetri then reads and decides which one he will choose, usually "Jokes".

Good, Bad, Interesting – Demetri presents a good, a bad and an interesting reaction to topics based on everyday life situations.

This is... – Often used as a transition, this segment features a single humorous concept related to the show's topic in which one or more cast members will act out.

Important Things Things – An infomercial narrated by Demetri in which imaginary products related to the show's topic are advertised for sale. The products are often comically impractical or unnecessary like the "Burning-Hand Potholder" featured in the Strategy episode.

Demetrocles/Da Mici – In this segment, Demetri presents a humorous concept related to the show's topic as an ancient philosopher much like Socrates or Plato or an inventor like Da Vinci.

Other Jokes – This segment consists of other jokes about the topic that weren't included in the Opening Act.

New Expressions – In this segment Demetri is approached by a series of people that talk about different situations. Demetri responds to each person with an original saying/expression that applies to the situation.

Episodes

Season 1 (2009)

Season 2 (2010)

Reception

Ratings
The Comedy Central show premiered on Wednesday February 11, 2009 and attracted 2.4 million viewers, making it the best cable series show since Chappelle's Show drew 2.5 million views in 2003.

Critical reception
The show has received generally positive reviews from critics, and currently has a 71/100 rating on metacritic.com, based on 8 reviews.

Cancellation
During a comedy show at College Park, Maryland on October 28, 2010, Demetri Martin confirmed that Comedy Central had not picked up the show for a third season.
The first season was released on DVD in 2009, while the remaining 10 episodes (the entire second season) have yet to see a release date as of 2020.

References

External links
 
 
 Demetri Martin Gets His Own Show!
 Demetri Martin gets his own show on Comedy Central
 Blogcritics – review – TV Preview: Important Things with Demetri Martin Premieres Feb. 11

2009 American television series debuts
2010 American television series endings
2000s American sketch comedy television series
2010s American sketch comedy television series
2000s American variety television series
2010s American variety television series
American television series with live action and animation
Comedy Central original programming
English-language television shows
Television series by Busboy Productions